Alojz Kovšca is a politician from Slovenia who is serving as President of the National Council of Slovenia.

Personal life
He was born in 13 September 1965 in Čapljina. His father was an officer of Yugoslav People's Army.

References

1965 births
Living people
Slovenian politicians